The Ten Commandments is a 1956 American epic religious drama film produced, directed, and narrated by Cecil B. DeMille, shot in VistaVision (color by Technicolor), and released by Paramount Pictures. Based on the 1949 novel Prince of Egypt by Dorothy Clarke Wilson, the 1859 novel Pillar of Fire by J. H. Ingraham, the 1937 novel On Eagle's Wings by A. E. Southon, and the Book of Exodus, The Ten Commandments dramatizes the biblical story of the life of Moses, an adopted Egyptian prince who becomes the deliverer of his real brethren, the enslaved Hebrews, and thereafter leads the Exodus to Mount Sinai, where he receives, from God, the Ten Commandments. The film stars Charlton Heston in the lead role, Yul Brynner as Rameses, Anne Baxter as Nefretiri, Edward G. Robinson as Dathan, Yvonne De Carlo as Sephora, Debra Paget as Lilia, and John Derek as Joshua; and features Sir Cedric Hardwicke as Seti I, Nina Foch as Bithiah, Martha Scott as Yochabel, Judith Anderson as Memnet, and Vincent Price as Baka, among others.

Filmed on location in Egypt, Mount Sinai, and the Sinai Peninsula, The Ten Commandments was DeMille's most successful work, his first widescreen film, his fourth biblical production, and his final directorial effort before his death in 1959. It is a remake of the prologue of his 1923 silent film of the same title, and features one of the largest exterior sets ever created for a motion picture. Four screenwriters, three art directors, and five costume designers worked on the film. The interior sets were constructed on Paramount's Hollywood soundstages. The original roadshow version included an onscreen introduction by DeMille and was released to cinemas in the United States on November 8, 1956, and, at the time of its release, was the most expensive film ever made.

In 1957, the film was nominated for seven Academy Awards, including Best Picture, winning the Academy Award for Best Visual Effects (John P. Fulton, A.S.C.). DeMille won the Foreign Language Press Film Critics Circle Award for Best Director. Charlton Heston was nominated for a Golden Globe Award for Best Performance by an Actor in a Motion Picture (Drama). Yul Brynner won the National Board of Review Award for Best Actor for this film, as well as for Anastasia and The King and I. Heston, Anne Baxter, and Yvonne De Carlo won Laurel Awards for Best Dramatic Actor, 5th Best Dramatic Actress, and 3rd Best Supporting Actress, respectively. It is also one of the most financially successful films ever made, grossing approximately $122.7 million at the box office during its initial release; it was the most successful film of 1956 and the second-highest-grossing film of the decade. According to Guinness World Records, in terms of theatrical exhibition, it is the eighth most successful film of all-time when the box office gross is adjusted for inflation.

In 1999, the film was selected for preservation in the United States National Film Registry by the Library of Congress as being "culturally, historically, or aesthetically significant". In June 2008, the American Film Institute revealed its "Ten Top Ten"—the best ten films in ten American film genres—after polling over 1,500 people from the creative community. The film was listed as the tenth best film in the epic genre. US Network television has aired the film in prime time during the Passover/Easter season every year since 1973.

Plot 

After hearing the prophecy of a Hebrew deliverer, Pharaoh Rameses I of Egypt orders the death of all newborn Hebrew males. Yochabel saves her infant son by setting him adrift in a basket on the Nile. Bithiah, the Pharaoh Rameses's recently widowed daughter (and sister of the future Pharaoh Seti I), finds the basket and decides to adopt the boy, even though her servant, Memnet, recognizes that the child is Hebrew. Bithiah names the baby Moses.

Prince Moses grows up to become a successful general, winning a war with Ethiopia and establishing an alliance. Moses and Nefretiri fall in love, but she must marry the next Pharaoh to preserve the royal line. While working on the building of a city for Pharaoh Seti I's jubilee, Moses meets the stonecutter Joshua, who tells him of the Hebrew God. Moses saves an elderly woman from being crushed, not knowing that she is his biological mother, Yochabel, and he reprimands the taskmaster and overseer Baka.

Moses reforms the treatment of slaves on the project, but Prince Rameses, Moses's adoptive brother and Seti's son, charges him with planning an insurrection. Moses says he is making his workers more productive, making Rameses wonder if Moses is the man the Hebrews are calling the Deliverer.

Nefretiri learns from Memnet that Moses is the son of Hebrew slaves. She kills Memnet, but reveals the story to Moses after he finds the piece of Levite cloth he was wrapped in as a baby, which Memnet had kept. Moses follows Bithiah to Yochabel's house, where he meets his biological mother, brother Aaron, and sister Miriam.

Moses learns more about the slaves by working with them. Nefretiri urges him to return to the palace, so that he may help his people when he becomes pharaoh, to which he agrees after he completes a final task. Moses saves Joshua from death by killing Baka, telling Joshua that he, too, is Hebrew. The confession is witnessed by the overseer Dathan, who then reports to Prince Rameses. After being arrested, Moses explains that he is not the Deliverer, but would free the slaves if he could. Seti I declares Prince Rameses his sole heir, and Rameses banishes Moses to the desert. At this time, Moses learns of the death of his mother.

Moses makes his way across the desert to a well in Midian. After defending seven sisters from Amalekites, Moses is housed with the girls' father Jethro, a Bedouin sheik, who worships the God of Abraham. Moses marries Jethro's eldest daughter Sephora. Later, he finds Joshua, who has escaped from the hard labor imposed on the Hebrews in Egypt. While herding, Moses sees the burning bush on the summit of Mount Sinai and hears the voice of God. Moses returns to Egypt to free the Hebrews.

Moses comes before Rameses, now Pharaoh Rameses II, to win the slaves' freedom, turning his staff into a cobra. Jannes performs the same trick with his staves, but Moses's snake swallows his. Rameses prohibits straw from being provided to the Hebrews to make their bricks. Nefretiri rescues Moses from being stoned to death by the Hebrews wherein he reveals that he is married.

Egypt is visited by plagues. Moses turns the river Nile to blood at a festival of Khnum, and brings burning hail down upon Pharaoh's palace. Moses warns him that the next plague to fall upon Egypt will be summoned by Pharaoh himself. Enraged at the plagues, Rameses orders that all first-born male Hebrews will die, but a cloud of death instead kills all the first-born of Egypt, including the child of Rameses and Nefretiri. Despairing at the loss of his heir, Pharaoh exiles the Hebrews, who begin the Exodus from Egypt.

After being taunted by Nefretiri, Rameses takes his chariots and pursues the Hebrews to the Red Sea. Moses uses God's help to stop the Egyptians with a pillar of fire, and parts the Red Sea. After the Hebrews make it to safety, Moses releases the walls of water, drowning the Egyptian army. A devastated Rameses returns empty-handed to Nefretiri, stating that he now acknowledges Moses's god as God.

Moses again ascends the mountain with Joshua. He sees the Ten Commandments created by God in two stone tablets. Meanwhile, an impatient  Dathan tells the people that Moses is dead and urges a reluctant Aaron to construct a golden calf idol. A wild saturnalia occurs and a decadent orgy is held by most of the Hebrews. 

After God informs Moses of the Hebrews fallen into debauchery, the latter descends from the mountain with Joshua. Enraged at the sight of decadence he deems the Hebrews unworthy, and smashes the tablets at the golden calf, which explodes, killing the wicked revelers, and causing the others to wander in the wilderness for forty years. An elderly Moses later leads the Hebrews towards Canaan. However, he cannot enter the Promised land due to a mentioned previous disobedience to the Lord. He instead names Joshua as leader, and bids farewell to the Hebrews at Mount Nebo.

Cast 

 Charlton Heston as Moses (and the voice of God at the Burning Bush)
 Yul Brynner as Rameses II
 Anne Baxter as Nefretiri
 Edward G. Robinson as Dathan
 Yvonne De Carlo as Sephora
 Debra Paget as Lilia
 John Derek as Joshua
 Sir Cedric Hardwicke as Seti I
 Nina Foch as Bithiah
 Martha Scott as Yochabel
 Judith Anderson as Memnet
 Vincent Price as Baka
 John Carradine as Aaron
 Olive Deering as Miriam
 Douglass Dumbrille as Jannes
 Frank de Kova as Abiram
 Henry Wilcoxon as Pentaur
 Eduard Franz as Jethro
 Donald Curtis as Mered
 Lawrence Dobkin as  Hur Ben Caleb
 H. B. Warner as Amminadab
 Julia Faye as Elisheba
 Lisa Mitchell, Noelle Williams, Joanna Merlin, Pat Richard, Joyce Vanderveen, and Diane Hall as Jethro's Daughters
 Abbas El Boughdadly as Rameses' Charioteer
 Cavalry Corps, Egyptian Armed Forces as Pharaoh's Chariot Host
 Fraser Heston as The Infant Moses
 John Miljan as The Blind One
 Francis J. McDonald as Simon
 Ian Keith as Rameses I
 Paul De Rolf as Eleazar
 Woodrow Strode as King of Ethiopia
 Tommy Duran as Gershom
 Eugene Mazzola as Rameses' Son (Amun)
 Ramsay Hill as Korah
 Joan Woodbury as Korah's Wife
 Esther Brown as Princess Tharbis
 Babette Bain as Little Miriam
 Kathy Garver as Rachel

Production

Writing 
The final shooting script was written by Aeneas MacKenzie, Jesse L. Lasky, Jr., Jack Gariss, and Fredric M. Frank. It also contained material from the books Prince of Egypt by Dorothy Clarke Wilson, Pillar of Fire by Joseph Holt Ingraham, and On Eagle's Wings by Arthur Eustace Southon. Henry Noerdlinger, the film's researcher, consulted ancient historical texts such as the Midrash Rabbah, Philo's Life of Moses, and the writings of Josephus and Eusebius, in order to "fill in" the missing years of Moses' life, and, as the film's last opening title card states, "the Holy Scriptures".

Casting

Leading roles

During the early stages of pre-production, DeMille considered casting a middle-aged man in the role of Moses. He offered the part to quinquagenarian actor and Hopalong Cassidy star William Boyd, but Boyd turned it down because he felt his cowboy fame would interfere with his portrayal of Moses. Charlton Heston, who had previously worked with DeMille in The Greatest Show on Earth, finally won the role after he impressed DeMille (at his audition) with his knowledge of ancient Egypt and his strong resemblance to Michelangelo's sculpture of Moses. Heston was also chosen to be the voice of God in the form of a burning bush, toned down to a softer and lower register.

DeMille described the role of Rameses II as "a part equal in dramatic strength to that of Moses". Rory Calhoun, Jeff Chandler, Anthony Dexter, Mel Ferrer, Stewart Granger, William Holden, and Michael Rennie were considered to play the film's leading antagonist. DeMille saw Yul Brynner in the Broadway musical The King and I, and went backstage to meet him. He told Brynner the story of the film from Rameses' point of view, and offered him the role.

	
Columnist Louella Parsons regarded the part of Nefretiri as "the most sought-after role of the year". Ann Blyth, Vanessa Brown, Joan Evans, Rhonda Fleming, Coleen Gray, Jane Griffiths, Audrey Hepburn, Jean Marie, Vivien Leigh, Jane Russell, and Joan Taylor were considered to portray the film's leading female character. DeMille liked Audrey Hepburn, but ruled her out when he noticed her figure was not curvaceous enough for Nefretiri's extravagant costumes. Anne Baxter was cast in the role. "There was only one DeMille, and there wasn't an actor in the world who didn't want to work for him just once, however short the salary or tall the corn", she wrote in her memoir.

Many actors were considered for the role of the evil overseer Dathan, including Raymond Burr, Lee J. Cobb, Leo Genn, Victor Jory, Fredric March, Raymond Massey, Stephen McNally, Gary Merrill, Arnold Moss, Robert Newton, Hugh O'Brian, Jack Palance, Eric Pohlmann, Basil Rathbone, Dale Robertson, Robert Ryan, George Sanders, Everett Sloane, and Peter Ustinov. DeMille was enthusiastic about Jack Palance as Dathan, but Palance's agent angered DeMille when he stole a part of the script and demanded that the part be rewritten. Raymond Massey was signed for the role, but later turned it down. DeMille then chose Edward G. Robinson, who was blacklisted in Hollywood. In his autobiography, Robinson remembered, "Mr. DeMille ... felt I had been done an injustice, and told his people to offer me the part. Cecil B. DeMille returned me to films. Cecil B. DeMille restored my self-respect."

The name of Moses' wife, Zipporah, was changed to "Sephora", the spelling that appears in the Douay–Rheims Bible. Judith Ames, Anne Bancroft, Anne Baxter, Shirley Booth, Diane Brewster, Peggie Castle, June Clayworth, Linda Darnell, Laura Elliot, Rhonda Fleming, Rita Gam, Grace Kelly, Jacqueline Green, Barbara Hale, Allison Hayes, Frances Lansing, Patricia Neal, Marie Palmer, Jean Peters, Ruth Roman, Barbara Rush, and Elizabeth Sellars were considered for the part. Grace Kelly, DeMille's first choice, was unavailable. DeMille was "very much impressed" with Yvonne De Carlo's performance as a "saintly type of woman" in MGM's Sombrero. He "sensed in her a depth, an emotional power, a womanly strength which the part of Sephora needed and which she gave it".

Supporting roles
	
DeMille considered Pier Angeli, Vanessa Brown, Pat Crowley, Piper Laurie, Irene Montwill, Lori Nelson, Cathy O'Donnell, Jean Peters, Donna Reed, Karen Sharpe, and Elaine Stewart for the part of the Hebrew water girl, Lilia. He wanted to cast Pier Angeli in the role, but MGM refused to loan their contract star to Paramount. Debra Paget was loaned from 20th Century-Fox.

Jeff Chandler, Tony Curtis, Vince Edwards, Eric Fleming, Arthur Franz, Rock Hudson, Brian Keith, Cameron Mitchell, George Nader, Jack Palance, Michael Pate, Richard Todd, Clint Walker, and Cornel Wilde were considered for the role of the stonecutter Joshua. DeMille's first choice was Wilde, who had worked with him in The Greatest Show on Earth. Wilde's casting was widely mentioned in the press. DeMille later remarked, "Cornel Wilde declined the role ... thus giving John Derek his opportunity for a noteworthy performance."

Claudette Colbert (the star of DeMille's Cleopatra), Joan Crawford, Bette Davis, Rosemary DeCamp, Irene Dunne, Merle Oberon, and Alexis Smith were considered for the role of Bithiah, before DeMille chose Jayne Meadows (who declined) and finally cast Nina Foch, on the suggestion of Henry Wilcoxon, who had worked with her in Scaramouche.

For the role of Memnet, Flora Robson was considered, and Bette Davis was interviewed (DeMille's casting journal also notes Marjorie Rambeau and Marie Windsor), but DeMille chose Judith Anderson after screening Alfred Hitchcock's Rebecca.

Heston's newborn son, Fraser (born February 12, 1955), was cast by DeMille (on the suggestion of Henry Wilcoxon, who said to him: "The timing's just right. If it's a boy, who better to play the Baby Moses?") as soon as Heston announced to DeMille that his wife Lydia was pregnant. Fraser Heston was three months old during filming.

Henry Wilcoxon's wife, Joan Woodbury, was cast as Korah's wife in the Golden Calf sequence.

DeMille was reluctant to cast anyone who had appeared in 20th Century Fox's The Egyptian, a rival production at the time. Several exceptions to this are the casting of John Carradine and Mimi Gibson (in credited supporting roles) and Michael Ansara and Peter Coe (in uncredited minor roles), who appeared in both films.

For the large crowd shots, at least 14,000 extras and 15,000 animals were used while filming The Ten Commandments.

Art direction 

Commentary for the film's DVD edition chronicles the historical research done by DeMille and associates.
The man who designed Moses' distinctive rust-white-and-black-striped robe used those colors because they looked impressive, and only later discovered that these are the actual colors of the Tribe of Levi. Arnold Friberg would later state that he was the one who designed Moses' costume. As a gift, after the production, DeMille gave Moses' robe to Friberg, who had it in his possession until his death in 2010. Moses' robe as worn by Charlton Heston was hand-woven by Dorothea Hulse, one of the world's finest weavers. She also created costumes for The Robe, as well as textiles and costume fabrics for Samson and Delilah, David and Bathsheba, and others.

Jesse Lasky Jr., a co-writer on The Ten Commandments, described how DeMille would customarily spread out prints of paintings by Lawrence Alma-Tadema to inform his set designers on the look he wanted to achieve. Arnold Friberg, in addition to designing sets and costumes, also contributed the manner in which Moses ordained Joshua to his mission at the end of the film: by the laying on of hands, placing his hands on Joshua's head. Friberg, a member of the Church of Jesus Christ of Latter-day Saints, demonstrated the LDS manner of performing such ordinations, and DeMille liked it.

The Pharaoh is usually shown wearing the red-and-white crown of Upper and Lower Egypt or the nemes royal headdress. For his pursuit of the Israelites, he wears the blue Khepresh helmet-crown, which the pharaohs wore for battle.

Sets, costumes and props from the film The Egyptian were bought and re-used for The Ten Commandments—including the red-and-white double crown. As the events in The Egyptian take place 70 years before the reign of Rameses II, an unintentional sense of continuity was created.

An Egyptian wall painting was also the source for the lively dance performed by a circle of young women at Sethi's birthday gala. Their movements and costumes are based on art from the Tomb of the Sixth Dynasty Grand Vizier Mehu.
Some of the film's cast members, such as Baxter, Paget, Derek, and Foch, wore brown contact lenses, at the behest of DeMille, in order to conceal their light-colored eyes which were considered inadequate for their roles. Paget once said that, "If it hadn't been for the lenses I wouldn't have got the part." However, she also said that the lenses were "awful to work in because the kleig lights heat them up". When DeMille cast Yvonne De Carlo as Sephora, she was worried about having to wear these contact lenses; she also believed that her gray eyes were her best feature. She asked DeMille to make an exception for her. He agreed, expressing the idea that De Carlo's role was special, and that Moses was to fall in love with her.

The Exodus set was a duplicated set from the 1923 film. It was built outside Cairo, Egypt, and was designed by Egyptian architect El Dine. Inside the set were a mess tent, a wardrobe department, and a stable for horses. The Golden Calf prop is also a duplicate from the film, likely on its kneeled position with a few modifications.

Special effects 

The special photographic effects in The Ten Commandments were created by John P. Fulton, A.S.C. (who received an Oscar for his effects in the film), head of the special effects department at Paramount Pictures, assisted by Paul Lerpae, A.S.C. in Optical Photography (blue screen "travelling matte" composites) and Farciot Edouart, A.S.C., in Process Photography (rear projection effects). Fulton's effects included the building of Seti's Jubilee treasure city, the Burning Bush, the fiery hail from a cloudless sky, the Angel of Death, the composites of the Exodus, the Pillar of Fire, the giving of the Ten Commandments, and the tour de force, the parting of the Red Sea.

The parting of the Red Sea was considered the most difficult special effect ever performed up to that time. This effect took about six months of VistaVision filming, and combined scenes shot on the shores of the Red Sea in Egypt, with scenes filmed at Paramount Studios in Hollywood of a huge water tank split by a U-shaped trough, into which approximately 360,000 gallons of water were released from the sides, as well as the filming of a giant waterfall also built on the Paramount backlot to create the effect of the walls of the parted sea out of the turbulent backwash. All of the multiple elements of the shot were then combined in Paul Lerpae's optical printer, and matte paintings of rocks by Jan Domela concealed the matte lines between the real elements and the special effects elements. The parting of the Red Sea sequence is considered by many to be one of the greatest special effects of all time.

Unlike the technique used by ILM for Raiders of the Lost Ark and Poltergeist of injecting poster paints into a glass tank containing a salt water inversion layer, the cloud effects for The Ten Commandments were formed with white Britt smoke filmed against a translucent sky backing, and colors were added optically. Striking portraits of Charlton Heston as Moses and three women in front of menacing clouds were photographed by Wallace Kelly, A.S.C. in Farciot Edouart's process (rear projection) department, in what are still considered unforgettable scenes. DeMille used these scenes to break up the montage, framing his subjects like a Renaissance master.

DeMille was reluctant to discuss technical details of how the film was made, especially the optical tricks used in the parting of the Red Sea. It was eventually revealed that footage of the Red Sea was spliced with film footage (run in reverse) of water pouring from large U-shaped trip-tanks set up in the studio backlot.

The voice of God in the burning bush scene was provided by Charlton Heston, but the voice of God in the tablet-giving scene was provided by a voice actor with a deep bass voice, Jesse Delos Jewkes, who was a member of the Mormon Tabernacle Choir. Additionally, Jewkes' voice was enhanced by the use of the vox humana stop of the Salt Lake Tabernacle organ. De Mille, who was good friends with LDS church president David O. McKay, asked for and received permission to record the organ from President McKay.

Music 
The score for The Ten Commandments was composed and conducted by Elmer Bernstein. Initially, DeMille hired Bernstein, then a relatively unknown film composer, to write and record only the diegetic music required for the film's dance sequences and other onscreen musical passages, with the intention of employing frequent collaborator Victor Young to write the score proper. However, Young turned down the assignment due to his own failing health, causing DeMille to hire Bernstein to write the underscore as well.

In total, Bernstein composed two and a half hours of music for the film, writing for a full symphony orchestra augmented with various ethnic and unusual instruments such as the shofar, the tiple, and the theremin. The score is written in a highly Romantic style, featuring unique musical leitmotifs for the film's characters (God, Moses, Rameses, Nefretiri, Dathan, Sephora, Lilia, Joshua, etc.) used in a manner inspired, at DeMille's direction, by the opera scores of Richard Wagner. Bernstein recorded both the diegetic music and the  score at the Paramount Studios Recording Stage in sessions spread from April 1955 to August 1956.

A double-LP monaural soundtrack album was released in 1957 by Dot Records, utilizing excerpts from the original film recordings. A stereo version of the 1957 album was released in 1960 containing new recordings conducted by Bernstein, as the original film recordings, while recorded in three-channel stereo, were not properly balanced for an LP stereo release, as the intent at the time of recording had been to mix the film masters to mono for the film soundtrack itself; this recording was later issued on CD by MCA Classics in 1989. For the film's tenth anniversary, United Artists Records released a second stereo re-recording in 1966, also conducted by Bernstein and employing different orchestral arrangements unique to this release.

For the film's 60th anniversary, Intrada Records released a six-CD album of the score in 2016. The Intrada release contains the complete two and a half hour score as originally recorded by Bernstein, with much of it remixed in true stereo for the first time. In addition, the 2016 release contains all the diegetic music recorded for the film, the original 1957 Dot album (in mono), the 1960 Dot album (in stereo), and the 1966 United Artists album, as well a 12-minute recording of Bernstein auditioning his thematic ideas for DeMille on the piano. The box set won the IFMCA Award for Best New Archival Release – Re-Release or Re-Recording of an Existing Score.

Release 

Cecil B. DeMille promoted the film by placing Ten Commandment monuments as a publicity stunt for the film in cities across the United States. The Ten Commandments premiered at New York City's Criterion Theatre on November 8, 1956. Among those who attended the premiere were Cecil B. DeMille and his eldest child, Cecilia DeMille Harper; Charlton Heston and his wife, Lydia Clarke; Yul Brynner; Anne Baxter; Edward G. Robinson; Yvonne De Carlo and her husband, Bob Morgan; Martha Scott and her husband, Mel Powell, and son, Carleton Alsop; William Holden and his wife, Brenda Marshall; John Wayne and his wife, Pilar Pallete; Tony Curtis and his wife, Janet Leigh; and Paramount Pictures president Barney Balaban. It played on a roadshow basis with reserved seating until mid-1958, when it finally entered general release.

The Ten Commandments was re-released in 1966 and 1972, and one more time in 1989. The 1972 and 1989 re-issues included 70mm and 35mm prints that reframed the picture's aspect ratio to 2.20:1 and 2.39:1, respectively, cropping the top and bottom of the picture's original 1.85:1 aspect ratio. The Ten Commandments was released on DVD on March 30, 1999; March 9, 2004, as a Special Collector's Edition; and March 29, 2011, as a Special edition and Standard edition. The Ten Commandments received a 4K UHD Blu-Ray release on March 30, 2021.

Reception

Box office 
The Ten Commandments was the highest-grossing film of 1956, and the second most successful film of the decade. By April 1957, the film had earned an unprecedented $10 million from engagements at just eighty theaters, averaging about $1 million per week, with more than seven million people paying to watch it. It played for 70 weeks at the Criterion Theatre in New York, grossing $2.7 million. During its initial release, it earned theater rentals (the distributor's share of the box office gross) of $31.3 million in North America, and $23.9 million from the foreign markets, for a total of $55.2 million (equating to approximately $122.7 million in ticket sales). It was hugely profitable for its era, earning a net profit of $18,500,000, against a production budget of $13.27 million (the most a film had cost up to that point).

By the time of its withdrawal from distribution at the end of 1960, The Ten Commandments had overtaken Gone with the Wind at the box office in the North American territory, and mounted a serious challenge in the global market—the worldwide takings for Gone with the Wind were reported to stand at $59 million at the time. Gone with the Wind would be re-released the following year as part of the American Civil War Centennial, and re-asserted its supremacy at the box office by reclaiming the US record. Also at this time, Ben-Hur—another biblical epic starring Charlton Heston, released at the end of 1959—would go on to eclipse The Ten Commandments at the box office. A 1966 re-issue earned $6,000,000, and further re-releases brought the total American theater rentals to $43 million, equivalent to gross ticket sales of $89 million at the box office. Globally, it ultimately collected $90,066,230 in revenues up to 1979.

It remains one of the most popular films ever made. Adjusted for inflation, it has earned a box office gross equivalent to $2 billion at 2011 prices, according to Guinness World Records; only Gone with the Wind (1939), Avatar (2009), Star Wars (1977), Titanic (1997), The Sound of Music (1965), and E.T. the Extra-Terrestrial (1982) have generated higher grosses in constant dollars. The Ten Commandments is estimated to have sold 262million tickets at the worldwide box office.

Critical response 

The Ten Commandments received generally positive reviews after its release, although some reviewers noted its divergence from the biblical text. Bosley Crowther for The New York Times was among those who lauded DeMille's work, acknowledging that "in its remarkable settings and décor, including an overwhelming facade of the Egyptian city from which the Exodus begins, and in the glowing Technicolor in which the picture is filmed—Mr. DeMille has worked photographic wonders". Variety described the "scenes of the greatness that was Egypt, and Hebrews by the thousands under the whip of the taskmasters" as "striking", and believed that the film "hits the peak of beauty with a sequence that is unelaborate, this being the Passover supper wherein Moses is shown with his family while the shadow of death falls on Egyptian first-borns".

James Powers of The Hollywood Reporter declared the film to be "the summit of screen achievement. It is not just a great and powerful motion picture, although it is that; it is also a new human experience. If there were but one print of this Paramount picture, the place of its showing would be the focus of a world-wide pilgrimage." Philip K. Scheuer, reviewing for the Los Angeles Times, declared the film served as "almost as a religious experience as it is a theatrical one. C. B. remains, at 75, the ablest living director of spectacle in the grand manner. His production measures up to the best for which his admirers have hoped—and far from the worst that his detractors expected. That old-time religion has a new look."

The film's cast was also complimented. Variety called Charlton Heston an "adaptable performer" who, as Moses, reveals "inner glow as he is called by God to remove the chains of slavery that hold his people". Powers felt that Heston was "splendid, handsome, and princely (and human) in the scenes dealing with him as a young man, and majestic and terrible as his role demands it. He is the great Michelangelo conception of Moses, but rather as the inspiration for the sculptor might have been than as a derivation." Variety also considered Yul Brynner to be an "expert" as Rameses, too. Anne Baxter's performance as Nefretiri was criticized by Variety as leaning "close to old-school siren histrionics", but Crowther believed that it, along with Brynner's, is "unquestionably apt and complementary to a lusty and melodramatic romance". The performances of Yvonne De Carlo and John Derek were acclaimed by Crowther as "notably good". He also commended the film's "large cast of characters" as "very good, from Sir Cedric Hardwicke as a droll and urbane Pharaoh to Edward G. Robinson as a treacherous overlord".

Leonard Maltin, a contemporary film critic, gave the film four out of four stars, and described it as "vivid storytelling at its best... Parting of the Red Sea, writing of the holy tablets are unforgettable highlights." The critic Camille Paglia has called The Ten Commandments one of the ten greatest films of all time.

Rotten Tomatoes retrospectively collected 44 reviews, and reported that 84% of critics have given the film a positive review, with an average rating of 7.6/10. The site's critics consensus states: "Bombastic and occasionally silly, but extravagantly entertaining, Cecil B. DeMille's all-star spectacular is a muscular retelling of the great Bible story."

Accolades

Competitive awards

Special awards
 American Jewish Congress Stephen S. Wise Medallion to DeMille for "the most inspiring film of the year". Charlton Heston, Yul Brynner, Edward G. Robinson, Sir Cedric Hardwicke, Nina Foch, and Martha Scott also received awards for their performances.
 Christopher Awards to DeMille, associate producer Henry Wilcoxon, and screenwriters Aeneas MacKenzie, Jesse L. Lasky, Jr., Jack Gariss, and Fredric M. Frank. They were honored "because of the picture's unique significance in relating eternal truths to modern problems".
 Fame Achievement Award to DeMille, "in recognition of a career of spectacular success in motion picture production, crowned with an historic landmark of the screen, The Ten Commandments".
 Foreign Language Press Film Critics Circle Special Award to DeMille for Best Picture, "on the basis of [the film's] expression of human ideals and aspirations". The circle represented 44 newspapers in 19 languages.
 General Federation of Women's Clubs Citation to DeMille for "the motion picture which had the best educational influence, The Ten Commandments".
 Los Angeles Examiner Award to DeMille for "his many outstanding motion pictures which have provided some of the world's greatest entertainment during the past 43 years, his undeviating championship of Americanism, his magnificent and ageless production of The Ten Commandments".
 Photoplay Achievement Award to DeMille for "the creation of one of the screen's greatest emotional and religious experiences, The Ten Commandments".
 Stanley Warner Theatre, Beverly Hills Plaque to DeMille for "the record run of his production, The Ten Commandments, united enduring truth with great entertainment, 15 November 1956 to 6 October 1957".
 Torah Award from the National Women's League of the United Synagogues of America, Pacific Southwest Branch, to DeMille for his "heroic conception" of The Ten Commandments and for "focusing attention on 'the moral law'".

Polls
 One of Film Daily'''s Ten Best Pictures of 1956.
 One of Photoplay's Ten Most Popular Motion Pictures of 1956.The Ten Commandments was included in three lists of the American Film Institute's AFI 100 Years... series:
 Moses as the No. 43 Hero in 100 Heroes and Villains (2003).
 #79 Most Inspiring American Movie in 100 Cheers (2006).
 #10 Epic Movie in 10 Top 10 (2008).

 Popularity 
Critics have argued that considerable liberties were taken with the biblical story of Exodus, compromising the film's claim to authenticity, but neither this nor its nearly four-hour length has had any effect on its popularity. In fact, many of the supposed inaccuracies were actually adopted by DeMille from extra-biblical ancient sources, such as Josephus, the Sepher ha-Yashar, and the Chronicle of Moses. Moses's career in Ethiopia, for instance, is based on ancient midrashim. For decades, a showing of The Ten Commandments was a popular fundraiser among revivalist Christian Churches, while the film was equally treasured by film buffs for DeMille's "cast of thousands" approach and the heroic acting.

Martin Scorsese later said it was one of his favorite films, writing in 1978 that:
I like De Mille: his theatricality, his images. I've seen The Ten Commandments maybe forty or fifty times. Forget the story - you've got to - and concentrate on the special effects, and the texture, and the color. For example: The figure of God, killing the first-born child, is a green smoke; then on the terrace, while they're talking, a green dry ice just touches the heel of George Reeves or somebody, and he dies. Then there's the reel Red Sea, and the lamb's blood of the Passover. De Mille presented a fantasy, dream-like quality on film that was so real, if you saw his movies as a child, they stuck with you for life.

 Home media The Ten Commandments has been released on DVD in the United States on four occasions: the first edition (Widescreen Collection) was released on March 30, 1999, as a two-disc set, the second edition (Special Collector's Edition) was released on March 9, 2004, as a two-disc set with commentary by Katherine Orrison, the third edition (50th Anniversary Collection) was released on March 21, 2006, as a three-disc set with the 1923 version and special features, and the fourth edition (55th Anniversary Edition) was released on DVD again in a two-disc set on March 29, 2011, and for the first time on Blu-ray in a two-disc set and a six-disc limited edition gift set with the 1923 version and DVD copies. In 2012, the limited edition gift set won the Home Media Award for Best Packaging (Paramount Pictures and Johns Byrne). In March 2021, a UHD Blu-ray was released. Using the 2010 6K scans, Paramount spent over 150 hours on new color work and clean-up.

 Television broadcast The Ten Commandments was first broadcast on the ABC network on February 18, 1973, and has aired annually on the network since then, with the exception of 1999, traditionally during the Passover and Easter holidays. Since 2006 the network has typically aired The Ten Commandments on the Saturday night prior to Easter, with the broadcast starting at 7:00 p.m. in the Eastern and Pacific Time Zones and 6:00 p.m. in the Central, Mountain, Alaska and Hawaii Time Zones. (Exceptions occurred in 2020 when the film aired prior to Palm Sunday, which that year was April 4, due to the COVID-19 pandemic; and in 2022, when the film aired on April 9, the Saturday before Palm Sunday, due to an NBA game telecast scheduled on the night before Easter the following week.) The film is one of only two pre-scheduled ABC Saturday Movies of the Week every year, the other being The Sound of Music.

Unlike many lengthy films of the day, which were usually broken up into separate airings over at least two nights, ABC elected to show The Ten Commandments in one night and has done so every year it has carried the film, with one exception; in 1997, ABC elected to split the movie in two and aired half of it in its normal Easter Sunday slot, which that year was March 30, with the second half airing on Monday, March 31 as counterprogramming to the other networks' offerings, which included CBS' coverage of the NCAA Men's Basketball Championship Game.

The length of the film combined with the necessary advertisement breaks has caused its broadcast window to vary over the years; today, ABC's total run time for The Ten Commandments'' stands at four hours and 44 minutes, just above one hour longer than its three-hour and 39-minute length. This requires the network to overrun into the 11:00 p.m./10:00 p.m. timeslot that belongs to the local affiliates, thus delaying their late local news and any other programming they may air in the overnight hours. Affiliates may also delay the film to the usual start of prime time at 8:00 p.m./7:00 p.m. to keep their schedules in line for early evening, at the cost of further delaying their local newscasts or forgoing them entirely.

In 2010, the film was broadcast in high definition for the first time, which allowed the television audience to see it in its original 1.66:1 VistaVision aspect ratio. It is also broadcast with its original Spanish language dub over the second audio program channel. In 2015, for the first time in several years, the network undertook a one-off airing of the film on Easter Sunday night, which fell on April 5.

Many of ABC's telecasts omit Cecil B. DeMille's opening prologue, objectionable scenes, and musical elements (Overture, Entr’acte, and Exit Music) seen in the theatrical release.

In the Philippines, the film is traditionally aired every Holy Week (yearly) since it premiered on April 1, 2015, on GMA Network, either cut for time or in full, and dubbed in Filipino.

 Ratings by year (since 2007)

See also 
 List of films based on the Bible
 List of American films of 1956
 Charlton Heston
 List of films featuring slavery

References

Sources

External links 

 
 
 
 
 
 
 Production design drawings for The Ten Commandments, Margaret Herrick Library, Academy of Motion Picture Arts and Sciences
 Costume design drawings for The Ten Commandments, Margaret Herrick Library, Academy of Motion Picture Arts and Sciences

Ten Commandments
1956 films
1956 drama films
American drama films
American epic films
Films directed by Cecil B. DeMille
Portrayals of Moses in film
Cultural depictions of Ramesses II
Cultural depictions of Nefertari
1950s English-language films
Films scored by Elmer Bernstein
Films about slavery
Films about the ten plagues of Egypt
Films based on multiple works
Films based on the Book of Exodus
Films set in ancient Egypt
Films set in the 13th century BC
Films that won the Best Visual Effects Academy Award
Films about God
Films about child death
Religious epic films
Remakes of American films
Sound film remakes of silent films
United States National Film Registry films
Paramount Pictures films
Films about Jews and Judaism
Seti I
Sword and sandal films
Articles containing video clips
1950s American films